Live at Oak Tree: The Series is a TV series from Daywind Records that airs on The Inspiration Network. The series presents many artists behind-the-scenes during all the preparation and recording of a live presentation.

The Series

Daywind Records started releasing the presentations of the series as CDs and DVDs. These are some of the ones they've released:

References

External links
INSP Adds Daywind Records’ “Live at Oak Tree” Series on INSP
Daywind's "Live At Oak Tree" Series Picks Up Regular Time Slot On INSP on SouthernGospel.com

American music television series